Tapinoma chiaromontei is a species of ant in the genus Tapinoma. Described by Menozzi in 1930, the species is endemic to Somalia.

References

Endemic fauna of Somalia
Tapinoma
Hymenoptera of Africa
Insects described in 1930